Koorunõmme Nature Reserve is a nature reserve which is located in Saare County, Estonia.

The area of the nature reserve is 1272 ha.

History of the protected area dates back to the year 1965 when Maapere stone grave conservation area was established. In 2004 the protected area was designated to the nature reserve.

References

Nature reserves in Estonia
Geography of Saare County